The Parri government of Italy held office from 21 June until 10 December 1945, a total of 172 days, or 5 months and 19 days. The reasons for its short period included the complex problems that Italy was experiencing and the limited capacity of Prime Minister Ferruccio Parri.

Government parties
The government was composed by the following parties:

Composition

|-
| colspan=6|

References

Italian governments
1945 establishments in Italy
1945 disestablishments in Italy